Valkmusa National Park is a national park in the Kymenlaakso region of Finland.

The national park comprises swamp land, extraordinarily representing in southern Finland. More than 30 different swamp types can be categorised in the area.

The park has a diverse birdlife. Characteristic of the species is abundant southern avifauna, and on the other hand the occurrence of northern species, such as the willow grouse and rustic bunting. The park is an important resting place for migratory birds. There is a very representing butterfly species in the area, which comprises many endangered species. The symbol species of the park is Idaea muricata.

See also 
 List of national parks of Finland
 Protected areas of Finland

References

External links
 Metsähallitus: Valkmusa National Park

Kotka
National parks of Finland
Protected areas established in 1996
Pyhtää
Geography of Kymenlaakso
Tourist attractions in Kymenlaakso
Ramsar sites in Finland